James Starley (21 April 1830 – 17 June 1881) was an English inventor and father of the bicycle industry. He was one of the most innovative and successful builders of bicycles and tricycles. His inventions include the differential gear and the perfection of the bicycle chain drive.

Childhood
Starley was born in 1830 at Albourne, West Sussex, the son of Daniel Starley, a farmer. He began working on the farm at nine, showing early talent as an inventor by making a rat trap from an umbrella rip and a branch of a willow tree. He ran away from home as a teenager and went to Lewisham, in south London. There he worked as an under-gardener, in his spare time mending watches and creating devices such as a mechanism to allow a duck to get through a hole in a fence, closing a door behind it if a rat tried to follow.

Adult life
Starley's employer, John Penn, bought a rare and expensive sewing machine. Starley mended it when it broke down and improved the mechanism. Penn knew Josiah Turner, a partner of Newton, Wilson and Company, the makers of the machine, and in 1859 Starley joined its factory in Holborn. Turner and Starley started their own Coventry Sewing Machine Company in Coventry around 1861. Turner's nephew brought a new French bone-shaker to the factory in 1868. The company started making bicycles and Coventry soon became the centre of the British bicycle industry.

Velocipedes (cycles) had wheels of increasingly disparate size, with the front growing ever larger than the rear. Notable were the high-wheelers, or penny-farthings, a version of which Starley made with William Hillman. Their Ariel vehicle was all-metal and had wire-spoked wheels, much lighter than wooden-spoke ones. Tangent spokes were patented in 1874. Lever-driven and chain-driven tricycles, often in strange configurations, were also devised for women and couples.

Starley, then aging, found it difficult to ride a tricycle sociable with his son, James, in the other saddle. They could not steer because one was stronger than the other. The historian Edward Lyte wrote: "Each rider of the sociable drove his own big wheel independently, so the course of the machine along the road was rather variable. One day Starley cried 'I have it!' and dismounted. He sat down to a cup of tea and forthwith invented the differential gear, an important mechanical design concept incorporated, e.g., in the back axle of every rear-wheel drive car. It was a Saturday. At 6am on the Monday the prototype was being made and at 8am Starley was stepping on to the London train to register patent No. 3388,1877."

Personal life

Starley married Jane Todd when he was in his early 20s. Their son, William Starley, and his nephew, John Kemp Starley, also entered the industry and one of the outcomes was the Rover car company.

Starley's sons continued manufacturing cycles after his death in 1881 but his nephew John Kemp Starley made more of a mark. It was John Kemp Starley and Sutton who devised the recognisably modern Rover safety bicycle with 26-inch wheels (still a standard size), chain drive, and a diamond-shaped frame (no seat-tube as yet) in 1884, showing it in 1885. The penny-farthing or ordinary cycle was not safe, with a "header" accident an ever-present danger. Others had experimented with chain-driven "safety cycles" but the Rover made its mark to the extent that "Rover" (spelled with a W rather than a V) means "bike" in countries such as Poland.

In due course, motor-driven bicycles became motor-cycles and were followed by motor cars. John Kemp Starley experimented with an electric tri-car around 1888 but the petrol-driven Rover 8hp car was sold in 1904, two years after his death.

Coventry University named a 1950s building after Starley; as of December 2019, it was undergoing demolition as part of a redevelopment program.

References 

1830 births
1881 deaths
People from Albourne
English inventors
British cycle designers
People associated with Coventry University